This is a list of CPU power dissipation figures of various consumer central processing units (CPUs).



Early CPUs
Note that these figures include power dissipation due to energy lost by the computer's power supply and some minor peripherals. However, since the CPU component of these early computers easily accounted for most of the computer's power dissipation, they are mentioned here:
 ENIAC, 150 kW average
 EDVAC, 50 kW average
 ORDVAC, 35 kW average
 UNIVAC I, 124.5 kW average
 Metrovick 950, 150 W (0.15 kW) average

Microprocessors 
If not stated otherwise, the watts dissipated refers to the peak-value thermal design power for a whole processor family.   Since thermal design power relates to the potential maximum thermally significant power used by the most energy using member of a processor family, it is not useful for comparing processors within a particular family. It is also not useful for comparison of the energy efficiency of individual processors in different families, because it relates to the family, not the individual CPU. Thermal design power is defined differently by different manufacturers, so it is not comparable between manufacturers.

Different architectures vary in how many operations they perform per clock cycle, so MHz/W values are not useful for comparing processors using different internal structure (see Megahertz myth). Since TDP is defined for families, not individual processors, MHz/TDP W are not useful for comparing processors using the same internal structure.

For measures of energy efficiency in computing, see Performance per watt.

IBM/Motorola/Freescale processors

PowerPC

Marvell XScale 
Marvell acquired an ARM license in 2003, and bought Intel's XScale line in 2006.

 80321 600 MHz, 0.5 watt
 PXA250
 PXA255
 PXA270
 PXA300, PXA310, PXA320

Intel processors

Desktop processors

Pentium

Pentium MMX

Pentium II

Pentium III 
Launched in 1999, the Pentium III became Intel's first processor to break the 1 GHz clock speed barrier. By 2000, the Pentium III was replaced by the Pentium 4, which performed even worse in certain applications. Although, in 2001, Intel had resurrected the Pentium III by introducing the Tualatin core. The Tualatin-based Pentium III had well outperformed the Willamette-based Pentium 4 in a variety of applications. However, it appeared that Intel wanted to market the Pentium 4 as their main processor and tried to "kill" the Pentium III by reducing the L2 cache (in the non-S variants) to 256 KB from 512 KB in the Katmai and Coppermine cores and by making the Tualatin-based Pentium IIIs incompatible with older socket 370 motherboards. The Pentium III-S have 512 KB L2 cache and have dual-processor support.

Pentium 4
Released on November 20, 2000, the Pentium 4 was based on an all new microarchitecture codenamed NetBurst. Pentium 4 processors achieved their high clock speeds by using an extremely long instruction pipeline (20 stages in the Willamette, Northwood and Gallatin cores and 31 stages in the Prescott, Prescott 2M and Cedar Mill cores). The Pentium 4 became Intel's hottest-running single-core processor along with their processor to have the longest instruction pipeline to date. Not only that, but the Pentium 4's performance was usually disappointing, as it could not often match the performance of AMD's Athlon, Athlon XP and Athlon 64 processors, and for the first models, even Intel's own Pentium III or even low-end processors such as the AMD Duron or the P6-based Intel Celeron. Intel tried to fix this problem with the introduction of the Prescott core, but it made the Pentium 4's problems even worse, as they performed worse than Northwood-based Pentium 4s in the same clock speed range and generated more heat. The Pentium 4 had reached a clock speed limit of 3.8 GHz by November, 2004 and on January 5, 2006 Intel released the final Pentium 4 models using the Cedar Mill core, which gave off less heat than Prescott. All processors in the Pentium 4 HT range have Hyper-threading, a feature that makes one physical CPU core work as two logical cores.

Pentium D
Released on May 26, 2005, the Pentium D was Intel's first dual-core processor, and like the Pentium 4 it was based on the NetBurst microarchitecture. The Pentium D uses the multi chip module design, which incorporates two dies on one package, and the Pentium D was essentially two Prescott-based Pentium 4 cores in one chip. While this did increase TDPs, it was not by a significant amount. All Pentium D models are 64-bit. The Pentium Extreme Edition processors have Hyper-Threading, which all Pentium D models lack.

Pentium Dual-Core 
In 2007, Intel released a new line of desktop processors under the brand Pentium Dual Core on a single die, using the Core microarchitecture (which was based upon the Pentium M architecture, which was itself based upon the Pentium III). The newer Pentium Dual-Core processors give off considerably less heat (65 watt max) than the Pentium D (95 or 130 watt max). They also run at lower clock rates, only have up to 2 MB L2 cache memory while the Pentium D has up to 2x2 MB, and they lack Hyper-threading.
Although using the Pentium name, the desktop Pentium Dual-Core is based on the Core microarchitecture, which can clearly be seen when comparing the specification to the Pentium D, which is based on the NetBurst microarchitecture first introduced in the Pentium 4. Below the 2 or 4 MiB of shared-L2-cache-enabled Core 2 Duo, the desktop Pentium Dual-Core has 1 or 2 MiB of shared L2 cache. In contrast, the Pentium D processors have either 2 or 4 MiB of non-shared L2 cache. Additionally, the fastest-clocked Pentium D has a factory boundary of 3.73 GHz, while the fastest-clocked desktop Pentium Dual-Core reaches 3.2 GHz. A major difference among these processors is that the desktop Pentium Dual Core processors have a TDP of only 65 W while the Pentium D ranges between 95 and 130 W. Despite the reduced clock speed, and lower amounts of cache, Pentium dual-core outperformed Pentium D by a fairly large margin.
The Pentium Dual-Core processors bridge the gap between Celeron and Core 2. 
As of 2009, Intel branded Pentium Dual-Core processors as Pentium. The E5x00 and E6x00 series use the same Wolfdale core as the Core 2 Duo series, and is essentially a Core 2 Duo E7x00 processor with 1 MB of L2 cache disabled.

Pentium Quad-Core ( Pentium, Pentium Silver )

Pentium Quad-Core is Intel's enhanced budget quad-core CPUs intended for low-cost computers applications.

Core 2
The Core 2 brand was released to address the NetBurst processor's heat and performance issues. The Core 2 brand is based on the P6 microarchitecture like the Pentium M and outperforms the Pentium 4.

Intel Core i3
The Core i3 is Intel's budget line of processors in the Core i brand. The Core i3-5xx series is nearly identical to the Core i5-6xx series. The major difference is that the Core i3-5xx series lacks Turbo Boost and is clocked at lower clock speeds.

Intel Core i5
The Core i5-7xx series is a mainstream quad-core variant of the Core i7 and is based on the Nehalem microarchitecture. The Core i5-7xx series lacks Hyper-threading and use a slower 2.5 GT/s DMI bus like the Lynnfield-based Core i7 and the mobile Core i7 processors. The Core i5-6xx series are based on the Westmere microarchitecture and are dual-core. They have Hyper-threading and Turbo Boost along with an integrated graphics core. The Core i5-6xx series should outperform the Core i7 in tasks that utilize only one or two cores because of the radically high clock speed, which can be further increased using Turbo Boost.

Intel Core i7
Core i7 is currently Intel's highest end series of processors designed for gameplay and mid-range to high-end business computers. Core i7 processors are the first to use the Nehalem microarchitecture, and therefore reintroduce Hyper-threading and, in the 9xx series, introduce Intel QuickPath Interconnect, a point-to-point link that is up to 16 times faster than a quad-pumped FSB. Core i7 processors up to the 5XXX series use an integrated memory controller that supports DDR3 memory. Most newer 6XXX and above chips support DDR4 memory. The lower-end 8xx models use a substantially slower 2.5 GT/s Direct Media Interface bus.

Intel Celeron (P6 based) 
Intel Celeron is Intel's series of budget processors.

Intel Celeron (NetBurst based)

Intel Celeron D
Celeron D is not a dual-core processor like Pentium D, it is branded Celeron D to distinguish it from older NetBurst-based Celerons (the same microarchitecture it is based on) and Celeron M.

Intel Celeron (Core based)

Intel Celeron Dual-Core
Intel Celeron Dual-Core is Intel's budget dual-core microprocessors intended for low cost desktops.

Laptop processors

Mobile Pentium II

Pentium III-M

Pentium 4-M
The Pentium 4-M and Mobile Pentium 4 were based on the same 130 nm Northwood core as the desktop version that preceded them. There were few differences between the two laptop variants, besides the latter chips having a faster front side bus clock (533 MHz vs 400 MHz), Hyper Threading and a much higher thermal design power. Due to the high TDPs of the Mobile Pentium 4s, laptops employing these chips often had severe overheating issues due to woefully inadequate cooling mechanisms and very poor battery life due to the high power consumption of the CPU.

Intel had a dilemma during this time due to the fact they had four different mobile processors being manufactured at the same time (Pentium 3-M, Pentium 4-M, Mobile Pentium 4 and the Pentium M.) The Pentium 3 was already in the process of being phased out, and the power consumption and TDP of both the Pentium 4-M and Mobile pentium 4 proved unsolvable and were subsequently discontinued in favor of the much more efficient Pentium M.

Pentium M
Pentium M is clocked slower than Pentium 4 and is derived from a more efficient P6-based Pentium M microarchitecture. The Pentium M was launched to address the Pentium 4-M's heat and performance problems. Notebooks using the Pentium M did not require a large and powerful cooling unit and could be built thin and light. While the Pentium M was clocked at significantly slower clock speeds than the Pentium 4-M, it did manage to outperform the Pentium 4-M (for example, a 1.6 GHz Pentium M could outperform a 2.4 GHz Pentium 4-M). In contrast to this, the Pentium M's main disappointment was in floating point operations, because the SSE2 implementations were not equal to those in the Pentium 4. Prefixes: LV=Low voltage, ULV=Ultra-low voltage.

Core
The Core brand was launched on January 5, 2006, the same day as the final Pentium 4 models. Core processors focus on energy efficiency and a better performance per watt ratio, which the Pentium M already offered. The Core processors added SSE3 but continued to use a 32-bit instruction set. The instruction pipeline was reduced to 12 stages, yet the fastest Core processor achieved a slightly higher clock speed compared to the Pentium M, thanks to a new 65 nm manufacturing process. The Core Solo is actually a Core Duo with one processor core disabled. Intel did this because it was a simpler and cheaper way instead of altering the Core microarchitecture to manufacture Core Solo processors with only one physical core, which would cost extra time and money.

Core 2 
The Core 2 brand improves upon the original Core processors by adding a 64-bit instruction set to the initial 32-bit one. In this range, the Core 2 Duo is the most significant processor line. The mobile Core 2 Quad is not clocked as high as its desktop variant to avoid creating heat problems in laptops the way the mobile Pentium 4 did. Similar to the Core Solo, the Core 2 Solo is actually a Core 2 Duo processor with one core disable for the same reason as the Core Solo. The Core 2 Quad is two Core 2 Duo dies in one package. All Core 2 models manufactured at a 45 nm lithography feature the SSE4.1 instruction set.

Intel Core i3

Intel Core i5

Intel Core i7

Intel Atom
Intel Atom is a series of Ultra Low Voltage processors made for ultraportables called "netbooks" and ultra small form factor desktops called "nettops". Because of their low clock speed, Intel Atom CPUs are highly energy efficient. Atom's microarchitecture is unique from other Intel CPUs. Certain Atom CPUs have Hyper-Threading.

Celeron M 

Like the Pentium M, the Celeron M was specifically made for use in laptops.

Celeron Dual-Core

Celeron Dual-Core is Intel's budget dual-core CPUs intended for low-cost computers, laptops and embedded applications.

Celeron Quad-Core

Celeron Quad-Core is Intel's budget quad-core CPUs intended for low-cost computers, laptops and embedded applications.

Celeron performance-core and efficient-cores

The Celeron series with performance-core and efficiency-cores is Intel's budget core CPUs intended for low-cost computers, laptops and embedded applications.

Pentium Dual-Core/Pentium

Intel Pentium (originally Pentium Dual-Core) is a line of single- and dual-core processors for lower-priced laptops. The SU2700 is the only single-core processor in the series and is intended for use with Intel's CULV platform. The Pentium Dual-Core T2060, T2080 and T2130 are not 64-bit as they are based on the Yonah core. Prefixies: T=Standard Voltage, SU=Ultra Low Voltage.

Pentium Quad-Core ( Pentium, Pentium Silver )

Pentium Quad-Core is Intel's enhanced budget quad-core CPUs intended for low-cost computers, mini-PC, laptops and embedded applications.

Pentium performance-core and efficient-cores

The Pentium series with performance-core and efficiency-cores is Intel's enhanced budget core CPUs intended for low-cost computers, laptops and embedded applications.

Server processors

Pentium Pro 

Launched in 1995, the Pentium Pro was Intel's first processor meant for servers as well as their first processor to use the P6 microarchitecture. The processor used a dual-cavity package, in which one cavity contained the die and the other cavity contained the L2 cache, as the Pentium Pro's L2 cache probably could not fit in the die. The Pentium Pro was substantially faster than the Pentium and Pentium MMX in 32-bit applications, but in 16-bit applications, it was slightly slower than the Pentium and Pentium MMX processors. This is because the Pentium Pro was optimized for 32-bit applications.

Xeon

"Drake" (250 nm)

"Tanner" (250 nm)

"Cascades" (180 nm)

"Prestonia" (130 nm)

Dual Core Xeon 

Intel part numbers

Xeon (Six Core, Core-based)

Intel Itanium

Intel Itanium 2

AMD processors

Desktop

Am486

Am5x86

K5

Released in 1996, the K5 was AMD's first processor developed entirely in-house. It was supposed to yield similar performance results as Intel's Pentium Pro, but the results were more comparable to a Pentium. Later K5 models were given a PR rating, in which they would perform as well as a processor with a higher clock speed at a lower clock speed. K5 processors were not given core names.

K6

K6-2

K6-III,K6-3+,K6-2+

Athlon 

Released in 1999, the Athlon was AMD's highest performing processor until the introduction of the Athlon XP and was considered a "seventh generation" processor in its time. The Athlon used a double-pumped FSB that ran at either 200 MHz or 266 MHz, or twice as fast as the Pentium III's FSB. But the Athlon and Pentium III  both still reached a clock speed barrier of 1.4 GHz, with the Athlon giving off significantly more heat than the Pentium III, yet offering better performance. Athlon processors did not have an actual model number, as did other AMD or Intel processors at the time. The number following the word Athlon represents the processor's clock speed in megahertz.

Athlon XP 

Around this time, AMD gave their processors a name which indicated the equivalent clock speed when measured against the Thunderbird-based Athlon. For example, the Athlon XP 1800+ would, in theory, have offered similar performance to a Thunderbird-based Athlon at clocked at 1.8 GHz despite being clocked at only 1.53 GHz, since it did more per clock cycle.

AMD Athlon 64

AMD List of AMD Athlon 64 microprocessors

AMD Athlon 64 X2 / Athlon X2 

AMD Athlon X2 (Socket 939) . . AMD part numbers . . List of AMD MPUs

AMD Athlon X2 (Socket AM2)

AMD Athlon X2 . .
AMD part numbers . . List of AMD MPUs

Athlon 64 FX

Introduced at the same time as the Athlon 64, the Athlon FX was (and still is) one of AMD's most expensive consumer processors, with some models costing over $1000. The two-digit model number on the Athlon 64 FX cannot be used to compare it to an Intel or AMD processor. Models FX-60, FX-62, FX-70, FX-72 and FX-74 are dual-core and the rest are single-core. The Athlon FX competed primarily with Intel's Pentium 4 Extreme Edition and dual-core Pentium Extreme Edition. The dual-core Athlon FX models were eligible for AMD's Quad FX platform, which pair two Athlon FX processors on a single motherboard to yield four total processing cores.

Athlon X2 (K10-based)

With the launch of the Phenom line, the Athlon line was repositioned as a mainstream brand, instead of being positioned as a mainstream and high-end brand since the introduction of the original Athlon in 1999. The Athlon X2 differs from the Phenom by lacking an L3 cache.

Phenom

Released in 2007, the Phenom was AMD's highest-end line of processors until the launch of the Phenom II. They were AMD's first processors to be based on the K10 microarchitecture, so they introduced a plethora of new features, including 2 MB of L3 cache, a faster HyperTransport link, a 128-bit FPU, an integrated memory controller that supports DDR2-1066 (PC2-8500) memory and were manufactured at a 65 nm process for the first time. AMD claims the Phenom X4 to be the first "true" quad-core processor, because it uses a monolithic die design rather than the multi-chip-module design used by the Core 2 Quad and quad-core Core 2 Extreme processors. Suffixes: B=Business class, e=energy efficient, Black Edition=unlocked clock multiplier.

Athlon II

The Athlon II adds triple- and quad-core processors to the initial dual-core Athlon X2 line. Suffixes: e=energy efficient.

Phenom II 
The Phenom II is AMD's high-end line of processors. The Phenom II models are a 45 nm die shrink of the original Phenom, so they reach higher clock speeds while keeping the same TDP. Also, a dual-core variant has been added to the Phenom II line. The Phenom II's memory controller supports up to DDR3-1333 (PC3-10600) memory and they have 4 MB or 6 MB of L3 cache, but they lack the SSE4.2 instruction set found in the Core i7. Prefixies/Suffixes: B=Business class, e=energy efficient, Black Edition=unlocked clock multiplier. Socket changed to AM3 with DDR3 RAM Speed; while still compatible with AM2+ motherboard with DDR2 memory.

Duron

The Duron was released in 2000 as a lower-end alternative to the high-performance Athlon. The Duron had only 64 KB of L2 cache, but used the same double-pumped EV6 bus as the Athlon. The Duron however, did not use the Slot A package as the Athlon. AMD later replaced the Duron with the Sempron.

Sempron (K10-based) 

While these Semprons are based on the K10 microarchitecture like the Athlon, Athlon II, Phenom and Phenom II, they do not have an L3 cache and only have one active core because the Sempron is still a low-end line. The Sempron 140 is actually a dual-core processor with one core disabled. Overclockers have managed to reactivate the second core and overclock the processor.

Mobile

Mobile Athlon 4

The Mobile Athlon 4 was the first mobile version of the Athlon XP. Mobile Athlon 4 models clocked below 1.3 GHz do not have a model number.

AMD Turion 64

Turion II 

Launched in 2009, the Turion II processors are the first mobile processors to use the K10 microarchitecture and are a 45 nm die shrink of the Turion 64 X2 and Turion 64 X2 Ultra. Unlike the desktop Phenom processors based on the K10 microarchitecture, these models don't have an L3 cache, but have 1 MB or 2 MB of L2 cache.

Sempron 

The Sempron replaced the aging Duron processor line.

AMD Sempron 64

AMD Mobile Sempron

AMD V series

AMD Athlon II

AMD Turion II

AMD Phenom II

AMD FX Desktop

AMD Ryzen Desktop

AMD Ryzen HEDT

AMD Ryzen Desktop APUs

AMD Ryzen Mobile APUs

AMD EPYC

Oracle / Sun processors

Sparc V9

VIA processors

Via C3

VIA Eden-N

Via C7

VIA Eden ULV

VIA Luke

Lists of Intel processors
 List of Intel microprocessors
 List of Intel Atom microprocessors
 List of Intel Celeron microprocessors
 List of Intel Pentium microprocessors
 List of Intel Pentium Dual-Core microprocessors
 List of Intel Core microprocessors
 List of Intel Core 2 microprocessors
 List of Intel Core i3 microprocessors
 List of Intel Core i5 microprocessors
 List of Intel Core i7 microprocessors
 List of Intel Xeon microprocessors

Lists of AMD processors
 List of AMD microprocessors
 List of AMD Athlon microprocessors
 List of AMD Athlon XP microprocessors
 List of AMD Athlon 64 microprocessors
 List of AMD Athlon X2 microprocessors
 List of AMD Duron microprocessors
 List of AMD Opteron microprocessors
 List of AMD Phenom microprocessors
 List of AMD Sempron microprocessors
 List of AMD Turion microprocessors
 List of AMD mobile microprocessors
 List of AMD processors with 3D graphics

References

External links
 Official Intel Products
 Official AMD Products
 Processor electrical specifications

Lists of microprocessors